The 2020–21 Moldovan Cup was the 30th season of the annual Moldovan football cup competition. The competition started on 8 August 2020 with the preliminary round and concluded with the final on 30 May 2021. The winner qualifies for the first qualifying round of the 2021–22 UEFA Europa Conference League.

Format and Schedule
The preliminary round and the first two rounds proper are regionalised to reduce teams travel costs.

Participating clubs
The following teams qualified for the competition:

Preliminary round
18 clubs from the Divizia B entered this round. Teams that finished higher on the league in the previous season played their ties away. 6 clubs from the Divizia B received a bye for the preliminary round. Matches were played on 8 August 2020.

First round
15 clubs from the Divizia B and 13 clubs from the Divizia A entered this round. In a match, the home advantage was granted to the team from the lower league. If two teams are from the same division, the team that finished higher on the league in the previous season played their tie away. Matches were played on 15 and 16 August 2020.

Second round
The 14 winners from the previous round joined the 2 Divizia Națională sides seeded 9-10, Florești and Dacia Buiucani. In a match, the home advantage was granted to the team from the lower league. If two teams are from the same division, the team that finished higher on the league in the previous season played their tie away. The pairs for 2 Divizia Națională sides were determined in a draw held on 18 August 2020. Matches were played on 28 and 29 August 2020.

Final stage

Bracket

Round of 16
The 8 winners from the previous round joined the remaining 8 Divizia Națională sides seeded 1-8. The home teams and the pairs were determined in a draw held on 4 September 2020. Matches were played on 27 and 28 October 2020.

Quarter-finals
The 8 winners from the previous round entered the quarter-finals. The home teams were determined in a draw held on 3 November 2020. Matches were played on 19 and 20 April 2021.

Semi-finals
The 4 winners from the previous round entered the semi-finals. The home teams were determined in a draw held on 22 April 2021. Matches were played on 4 May 2021.

Final

The final was played on Sunday 30 May 2021 at the Zimbru Stadium in Chișinău. The "home" team (for administrative purposes) was determined by an additional draw held on 6 May 2021.

References

External links
Cupa Moldovei on soccerway

Moldovan Cup seasons
Moldova
2020–21 in Moldovan football